Fontenay-le-Pesnel War Cemetery is a Second World War cemetery of Commonwealth soldiers in France, located 16 km west of Caen, Normandy. The cemetery contains 461 commonwealth graves and 59 German graves.

History
A large number of burials date to between the June July 1944, during the Allied attacks to the west and southwest of Caen. A large number of the soldiers interred are from the South Staffordshire, East Lancashire and Royal Warwickshire Regiments plus the Durham Light Infantry.

The 59 German soldiers buried in the cemetery are mainly from the 12th SS Panzer Division Hitlerjugend.

Location
The cemetery is one kilometre south-east of the hamlet of Saint-Martin, Fontenay-le-Pesnel, on the D.139, on the territory of Tessel.

See also
 American Battle Monuments Commission
 UK National Inventory of War Memorials
 German War Graves Commission
 List of military cemeteries in Normandy

References

Further reading
 Shilleto, Carl, and Tolhurst, Mike (2008). "A Traveler’s Guide to D-Day and the Battle of Normandy". Northampton, Mass.: Interlink.

External links

 

World War II memorials in France
World War II cemeteries in France
British military memorials and cemeteries
Commonwealth War Graves Commission cemeteries in France
Canadian military memorials and cemeteries
1944 establishments in France
Cemeteries in Calvados (department)